Matthew A. Harkins (November 17, 1845 – May 25, 1921) was an American prelate of the Roman Catholic Church. He served as the second bishop of the Diocese of Providence in Rhode Island from 1887 until his death in 1921.

Biography

Early life 
Matthew A. Harkins was born in Boston, Massachusetts to Patrick Harkins, an Irish immigrant, and his wife, Margaret. He received his early education at a primary school on Tremont Street in Boston and at a grammar school in Quincy, Massachusetts.

He attended Boston Latin School from 1859 to 1862, when he entered Holy Cross College in Worcester, Massachusetts. After a year at Holy Cross, he went to France to study at the English College, Douai and the Église Saint-Sulpice, Paris.

Priesthood 
While in Paris, Harkins was ordained to the priesthood by Archbishop Henri Maret for the Archdiocese of Boston on May 22, 1869. After studying theology and canon law at the Pontifical Gregorian University in Rome, Harkins returned to Massachusetts in 1870.  He was then appointed as curate at the Church of the Immaculate Conception Parish in Salem, Massachusetts.

Harkins then served as pastor of St. Malachi Parish in Arlington, Massachusetts from 1876 to 1884, and then as pastor of St. James Parish in Boston (then the largest parish in New England) from 1884 to 1887. In 1884, he accompanied Archbishop John Williams to the Third Plenary Council of Baltimore as a theologian.

Bishop of Providence 
On February 11, 1887, Harkins was appointed the second bishop of the Diocese of Providence by Pope Leo XIII. He received his episcopal consecration on April 14, 1887m from Archbishop Williams, with Bishops Patrick O'Reilly and Lawrence McMahon serving as co-consecrators, at the Cathedral of SS Peter and Paul in Providence. During Harkins' tenure, the diocese grew to be among the largest in the country and to have one of the highest percentage of Catholics.

In 1904, the Holy See split the Diocese of Fall River out of the Diocese of Providence.  This left 190,000 Catholics in the Diocese of Providence, which increased to 275,180 by 1920. Harkins increased the number of parishes from 39 to 95; most of these new parishes were erected in the cities and growing suburbs, and designated for various ethnic groups. He established numerous charitable organizations and parochial schools as well. He was responsible for creating the first Roman Catholic college in the diocese, Providence College, in 1917.

Due to Harkins' advancing age and declining health, the Vatican appointed two auxiliary bishops between May 1914 and October 1917, and a coadjutor bishop in April 1919 to assist him.

Death and legacy 
Matthew Harkins died in Providence on May 25, 1921, at age 75.   Bishop Harkins Hall at Providence College is named for him.

References

External links
 Official site of the Holy See

Episcopal succession

1845 births
1921 deaths
Clergy from Boston
American Roman Catholic clergy of Irish descent
English College, Douai alumni
College of the Holy Cross alumni
Seminary of Saint-Sulpice (France) alumni
Providence College
Roman Catholic bishops of Providence
19th-century Roman Catholic bishops in the United States
20th-century Roman Catholic bishops in the United States